John Furber Dexter (1848, Kensington, London - 1927, Wandsworth, London) was an English collector of Charles Dickens's works. Following his death Dexter's collection remained in family hands before being purchased by the British Library in 1969 as the Dexter Collection of Dickensiana.

References

1848 births
1927 deaths
English antiquarians
English book and manuscript collectors